Lisa Green may refer to:
 Lisa Green (tennis) (born 1968), American tennis player
 Lisa Gould (born 1967), married name Green, British tennis player
 Lisa Green (linguist), linguist specializing in syntax and African American English